The John Carveth House, also known as the Aaron Clark House or the Lone Willow Farm, is a private house located at 614 West Main Street in Middleville, Michigan.  It was designated a Michigan State Historic Site in 1992 and listed on the National Register of Historic Places in 1992.

History
John Carveth was born in 1841 in Saranac, Michigan. He worked for a time as a teacher, but in 1867 moved to Middleville to read law.  He was admitted to the bar in 1868 and established a practice in Middleville, and in 1885-86 served as a state senator from the district.  In 1886, he built the house for his own use.  Carveth lived here until 1895, when he sold the house to his brother-in-law and one-time law partner, Aaron Clark.

Description
The John Carveth House is an elaborate, asymmetrical two-story Queen Anne structure.  It has a wood frame with a steep cross-gable and hip roof and sits on an ashlar fieldstone foundation.  The house is covered with clapboard siding, with additional patterned shingling and decorative siding in the gables. A broad veranda features decorative spindlework, broad arches, and bull's eye motifs, as does the balvony above.  Many first floor windows contain an upper sash with tinted margin lights flanking a clear center light.  The interior boasts decorative Eastlake designs around windows, fireplace, and other trim.

A two-story frame side-gable carriage house/barn is located near the house, as is small milking parlor and a modern garage.

References

Houses completed in 1886
Houses on the National Register of Historic Places in Michigan
Queen Anne architecture in Michigan
Houses in Barry County, Michigan
National Register of Historic Places in Barry County, Michigan